Events from the year 2002 in Denmark.

Incumbents
 Monarch – Margrethe II
 Prime minister – Anders Fogh Rasmussen

Events
19 October – The first phase of the Copenhagen Metro, running from Nørreport to Lergravsparken, is opened by Queen Margrethe II.
12 December – A European Council is held in the Bella Center, Copenhagen, an agreement is reached for May 2004 enlargement.

Culture

Film

Literature

Media
 15 February – It is announced that Erik Refner from Berlingske Tidende wins the World Press Photo of the Year award for a picture of the body of an Afghan refugee being prepared for burial.
 22 October – The newspaper Dagen is founded.

Music
 9 February – Dansk Melodi Grand Prix 2002 
 25 May – For the first time Denmark came last in Eurovision Song Contest receiving only 7 points, although song "Tell Me Who You Are" by Malene Mortensen was one of favourites to win.
 4 October — Dåbens Pagt (Pact of the Baptism) by Frederik Magle is premiered at the christening of Prince Felix of Denmark

Sports

Badminton
 5–9 March — Camilla Martin wins gold in Women's Single at the 92nd All England Open.
 13–20 April – With five gold medals, two silver medals and four bronze medias, Denmark finishes as the best nation at the 18th European Badminton Championships in Malmö, Sweden.

Cycling
 6 October – Jakob Piil wins 2002 Paris–Tours.

Football
 31 May – June 39 — Denmark participates in the 2002 FIFA World Cup in Japan and South Korea.
 1 June – Denmark defeats Uruguay 2–1 in their first match in Group A of the initial group stage.
 6 June – Denmark draws against Senegal in their second group stage match.
 11 June – Denmark wins group A by defeating France 2–0 in their last group stage match and is ready for the knockout stage.
 16 June – Denmark is defeated 3–0 by England in the Round of 16 and is finished in the tournament.

Golf
 26 May — Anders Hansen wins the BMW PGA Championship on the 2002 European Tour.
 30 June — Søren Hansen wins Murphy's Irish Open on the 2002 European Tour.
 1 September — Thomas Bjørn wins the BMW International Open on the 2002 European Tour.
 27 October — Steen Tinning wins Telefónica Open de Madrid on the 2002 European Tour.

Handball
 3 February — Denmark wins bronze at the 2002 European Men's Handball Championship by defeating Iceland 20–22 in the third place play-offs.
 6–15 December — 2002 European Women's Handball Championship takes place in Denmark.
 15 December Denmark wins gold by defeating Norway 25–22 in the final.

Other
 16 June — Tom Kristensen wins the 2002 24 Hours of Le Mans as part of the Audi team, his fourth win of the 24 Hours of Le Mans race.
 11 August — Wilson Kipketer wins gold in Men's 800 metres at the 2002 European Athletics Championships in Munich, Germany.
 29 November — Mikkel Kessler fights for his first championship and defeats former WBC super middleweight champion Dingaan Thobela over twelve rounds to become IBA champion.

Births
22 July – Prince Felix
21 December – Clara Tauson, tennis player

Deaths
 12 February – John Eriksen, Danish football player (b. 1957)

See also
2002 in Danish television

References

 
Denmark
Years of the 21st century in Denmark
Denmark
2000s in Denmark